Ulrike Winter (born 24 November 1940) is an Australian former fencer. She competed in the women's team foil event at the 1964 Summer Olympics.

References

1940 births
Living people
Australian female foil fencers
Olympic fencers of Australia
Fencers at the 1964 Summer Olympics